Kim Il-sung, former leader of North Korea, held many titles and offices during his lifetime. Despite his death in 1994, he is currently the Eternal President of the Republic.

Usage in North Korean media 
When he is mentioned in North Korean media and publications, he is most commonly referred to as "Great Leader Comrade Kim Il-sung" (Korean: 위대한 수령 김일성동지) or "Leader" (Korean: 수령님). 

When his name is written, it is always emphasised by a special bold font or in a larger font size, for example: "Great Leader Comrade Kim Il-sung is the Founder of the Socialist Cause of Juche, the Founder of Socialist Korea" or "Great Leader Comrade  is the Founder of the Socialist Cause of Juche, the Founder of Socialist Korea."

List of official titles and offices

Official titles

Held offices and titles

List of propagated titles

See also

Held titles 

 Chairman of the Workers' Party of Korea
 General Secretary of the Workers' Party of Korea
 Premier of the Cabinet of the DPRK
 Chairman of the National Defence Commission of North Korea
 Supreme Commander of the Korean People's Army
 Eternal leaders of North Korea

Related 
 List of Kim Jong-il's titles
 List of Kim Jong-un's titles

References 

Kim Il-sung
Propaganda in North Korea
Kim Il-sung